Tudor domain-containing protein 3 is a protein that in humans is encoded by the TDRD3 gene.
It contains a Tudor domain and UBA protein domain and has three distinct Protein isoforms.

References

Further reading